The EDP Cernavodă Wind Farm is located in Cernavodă, Constanța County, Romania. It has 46 individual wind turbines with a nominal output of around 3 MW which delivers up to 138 MW of power, enough to power over 85,000 homes, which required a capital investment of approximately €200 million. The project was undertaken and commissioned between 2010 and May 2011. The substation control system is based on ABB MicroSCADA Pro technology using LON and DNP protocol communication with field equipment and IEC104 with two dispatch centres situated in Porto, Portugal and Bucharest, Romania|. The control and protection system was designed and engineered by Spanish company GEDLux Sistemas de Control.

The wind farm is owned by EDP Renováveis, the renewable energy branch of the Portuguese conglomerate Energias de Portugal.

References

Wind farms in Romania